Janette Husárová and Arantxa Sánchez Vicario were the defending champions, but did not compete this year.

Janet Lee and Wynne Prakusya won the title by defeating María Vento-Kabchi and Angelique Widjaja 6–1, 6–3 in the final.

Seeds

Draw

Draw

Qualifying

Seeds

Qualifiers
  Yan Zi /  Zheng Jie

Draw

External links
 ITF Tournament Details
 Main and Qualifying Draws (WTA)

2003 WTA Tour
2003 Qatar Total Fina Elf Open – Doubles
2003 in Qatari sport